Frederick Marks may refer to:

 Fred Marks (1868–1952), English cricketer
 Frederick W. Marks (born 1940), American historian and Catholic apologist
 Freddy Marks (1949–2021), musician

See also
Frederick Marx, producer / director